Eucera fulvitarsis is a species of long-horned bee in the family Apidae. It is found in North America.

Subspecies
These two subspecies belong to the species Eucera fulvitarsis:
 Eucera fulvitarsis annae (Cockerell, 1906)
 Eucera fulvitarsis fulvitarsis (Cresson, 1878)

References

Further reading

 

Apinae
Articles created by Qbugbot
Insects described in 1878